I, Flathead: The Songs of Kash Buk and the Klowns is the fourteenth studio album by Ry Cooder. It is the final concept album by Ry Cooder.  It is the third in his "California trilogy", which began with Chávez Ravine (2005) and My Name Is Buddy (2007).

The Deluxe Edition of the album is accompanied by a 104-page hardback book which included a CD in paper pocket, a novella (on 97 pages) and song lyrics.

The title is a play on the Isaac Asimov novel "I, Robot", but the flathead in question is the Ford Flathead engine.

Track listing 
All tracks composed by Ry Cooder; except where indicated
 "Drive Like I Never Been Hurt" (Ry Cooder, Joachim Cooder) - 4:07
 "Waitin' for Some Girl" - 3:48
 "Johnny Cash" - 3:08
 "Can I Smoke in Here?" - 4:19
 "Steel Guitar Heaven" - 3:40
 "Ridin' with the Blues" - 3:01
 "Pink-O Boogie" - 3:05
 "Fernando Sez" - 4:44
 "Spayed Kooley" - 2:09
 "Filipino Dancehall Girl" - 3:54
 "My Dwarf is Getting Tired" - 3:59
 "Flathead One More Time" (Ry Cooder, Joachim Cooder, Jared Smith) - 3:12
 "5000 Country Music Songs" - 6:41
 "Little Trona Girl" (Ry Cooder, Joachim Cooder) - 3:13

Personnel

Musicians 
Gil Bernal - Tenor saxophone 
Ron Blake – Trumpet
Rene Camacho – Double bass
Juliette Commagere – Vocals (14)
Joachim Cooder – Drums, Timbales
Ry Cooder – Vocals, Guitars, Bass guitar, Mandolin, Electric piano, Producer, Package Design, Laud
Jesús Guzmán – Arranger, String Arrangements
Jon Hassell – Trumpet
Flaco Jiménez – Accordion
Jim Keltner – Drums
Martin Pradler – Drums, Electric piano, Engineer, Mixing, Package Design
Jared Smith - Keyboards
Francisco Torres – Trombone
Mariachi Los Campreros

Production 
Producer - Ry Cooder
Recorded & mixed by Martin Pradler
Production Supervisor, Karina Benznicki 	
Production Coordination, Eli Cane
Editorial Coordinator, Ronen Givony
Mastering by Stephen Marcussen
Assistant, Alex Pavlides

Artwork 
Cover photo by Robert Wilson Kellogg

Releases

References

Further reading / listening 
"Cooder's Buddy Revives Tales of Bygone America", Morning Edition, NPR, March 6, 2007
"From the Dust", The Observer, March 4, 2007

External links 
My Name is Buddy, site at Nonesuch Records

2008 albums
Ry Cooder albums
Concept albums
Nonesuch Records albums
Albums produced by Ry Cooder